Kent is an unincorporated community in Culberson County, Texas, United States. It is sandwiched between the railroad, immediately to its north, and the Interstate. As of 2005, its population was estimated at 60 residents, with three small businesses, a general store, a service station, and a post office, as well as ruins of a public school and other businesses that flourished until the 1960s. As of 2014, only the general store remained in operation; the nearest service station is in Plateau,  to the west along Interstate 10. As of May 9, 2019, the post office closed and redirected customers to Van Horn. No motels, hotels, trailer/RV parks, restaurants, or other tourist services are available. The surrounding county area contains semi-desert land supporting large cattle ranches.

Climate
According to the Köppen climate classification, Kent has a semiarid climate, BSk on climate maps.

See also 
List of ghost towns in Texas
Trans-Pecos
Lobo, Texas

References

External links

Unincorporated communities in Texas
Unincorporated communities in Culberson County, Texas
Ghost towns in West Texas